In time may refer to:
 Punctuality

Film
 In Time, a 2011 American science fiction film

Music
 In Time (Mat Maneri album), 1994
 In Time: The Best of R.E.M. 1988–2003, a compilation album by the music group R.E.M.
 In Time (The Mavericks album), 2013
 "In Time", a 1968 song by Jefferson Airplane from the album Crown of Creation
 "In Time", a 1973 song by Sly and the Family Stone from the album Fresh
 "In Time", a song by FKA Twigs from the EP M3LL155X
 "In Time", a song by Kris Allen from the 2014 album Horizons
 "In Time", a song by Robbie Robb, on the soundtrack of 1989 film Bill & Ted's Excellent Adventure.
 "In Time", a song by Mark Collie from the album The Punisher: The Album

See also
Intime (disambiguation)